Who Killed Bambi? is a 2003 French thriller film directed by Gilles Marchand. In this film, a doctor and a nursing student investigate the mysterious disappearances taking place at their hospital.

Cast
 Sophie Quinton as Isabelle / Bambi
 Laurent Lucas as Dr. Philipp
 Catherine Jacob as Véronique
 Yasmine Belmadi as Sami
 Michèle Moretti as Mme Vachon
 Valérie Donzelli as Nathalie
 Fily Keita as Marion
 Sophie Medina as Carole
 Jean Dell as The otorhinolaryngology
 Joséphine de Meaux as The mute nurse
 Jean-Claude Jay as The white-haired surgeon
 Aladin Reibel as The fair-headed anaesthetist
 Thierry Bosc as The general manager
 Lucia Sanchez as The Spanish nurse

Release
It was screened out of competition at the 2003 Cannes Film Festival.

Critical response
On Rotten Tomatoes, the film holds an approval rating of 43%, based on 21 reviews, with an average rating of 5.4/10. On Metacritic the film has a score of 47 out of 100, based on eight critics, indicating "mixed or average reviews".

Accolades

References

External links

2003 films
2000s French-language films
French psychological thriller films
2003 psychological thriller films
Films directed by Gilles Marchand
2003 directorial debut films
2000s French films